

Films

References

Films
2013
2013-related lists